This article lists census-designated places (CDPs) in the U.S. state of Missouri. As of 2020, there were a total of 131 census-designated places in Missouri.

Census-Designated Places

References

See also
List of cities in Missouri
List of counties in Missouri
List of villages in Missouri

 
Census-designated places
Missouri